Entwistle is a village in the Blackburn with Darwen unitary authority in Lancashire in the north west of England.

Its name derives from the Old English ened and twisla which means a river fork frequented by ducks. The name was recorded as Hennetwisel in 1212, Ennetwysel in 1276 and Entwissell in 1311. Entwistle is situated in a fork between the Edgeworth Brook and a smaller tributary. Entwistle was originally a township in the chapelry of Turton which was part of the large ecclesiastical parish of Bolton le Moors in the hundred of Salford.
 
Entwistle Hall is a 16th-century farmhouse which dates from the time of the Entwistle family. It is a Grade II listed building.  The south facing front of the Hall still has many Tudor features including mullioned windows with dripstone headings.

Entwistle railway station, situated between Darwen and Bromley Cross railway stations on the line between Blackburn and Bolton, is a request stop. The station is situated close to the Strawbury Duck public house.

Nearby streams have been dammed to form the Wayoh and Turton and Entwistle Reservoirs. The area is popular with walkers, anglers and joggers.

Entwistle, which lies to the north-eastern corner of the old Turton Urban District (which also includes Edgworth, Quarlton, Bradshaw, Harwood, Turton, and Longworth), is about 1,000 feet above sea level and consists of some 1,668 acres.

Notable people
 

James Brandwood (1739–1826), Quaker minister

References
Notes

Bibliography

External links

Villages in Lancashire
Geography of Blackburn with Darwen
West Pennine Moors